Louis Klopsche Finney (August 13, 1910 – April 22, 1966) was an American professional baseball player. He spent fifteen seasons in Major League Baseball (MLB) playing for the Philadelphia Athletics (1931; 1933–1939), Boston Red Sox (1939–1942; 1944–45), St. Louis Browns (1945–46), and Philadelphia Phillies (1947) as an outfielder and first baseman.

Finney was of Scotch-Irish descent; he was named in memory of Louis Klopsch, a German-American immigrant and founder of The Christian Herald magazine, who died in 1910. An older brother, Hal, was also a Major League player, a catcher for the Pittsburgh Pirates.

Lou Finney's professional baseball career began in the minor leagues in 1930; the next season, he was called up to the pennant-bound Athletics in September, and he batted .375 in nine games—including back-to-back three-hit outings against the Cleveland Indians on September 14–15.  He did not appear in the 1931 World Series, which Philadelphia lost to the St. Louis Cardinals, and spent 1932 with the Portland Beavers of the Pacific Coast League, batting .351 with 268 hits.

Finney then split  between the Athletics, getting into 74 games as a back-up outfielder, and the top-level Montreal Royals of the International League. Finney was the club's regular first baseman in both 1936 and 1938, batting .302 with 197 hits in the former year.

Then, on May 8, 1939, his contract was purchased by the first division Red Sox. With Boston, Finney benefited from the batting tips offered by Hall of Famer Hugh Duffy, a veteran Red Sox scout and hitting instructor. Finney batted .320 with 171 hits, and was named to the 1940 American League All-Star Team.

In 15 Major League seasons, Finney played in 1,270 games and had 4,631 at bats, 643 runs scored, 1,329 hits, 203 doubles, 85 triples, 31 home runs, 494 runs batted in, 39 stolen bases, 329 bases on balls, a .287 batting average, .336 on-base percentage, .388 slugging percentage, 1,795 total bases and 63 sacrifice hits. He led the American League in at bats (653) in 1936 and finished 29th in voting for the 1940 American League MVP Award for leading the AL in at bats per strikeout (41.1)

Finney played and managed in minor league baseball after his final stint in MLB with the 1947 Phillies.  He died from coronary thrombosis in LaFayette, Alabama, at the age of 55.

References

External links
Baseball Reference

1910 births
1966 deaths
American League All-Stars
Baseball players from Alabama
Boston Red Sox players
Carrollton Champs players
Deaths from coronary thrombosis
Harrisburg Senators players
Major League Baseball first basemen
Major League Baseball outfielders
Major League Baseball right fielders
Montreal Royals players
People from Chambers County, Alabama
Philadelphia Athletics players
Philadelphia Phillies players
Portland Beavers players
St. Louis Browns players
St. Petersburg Saints players
Temple Eagles players
Valley Rebels players
West Palm Beach Indians players
York White Roses players